Chuncheon Station is a railway station on, and the eastern terminus of, the Gyeongchun Line in Geunhwa-dong, Chuncheon-si, Gangwon-do, South Korea. It was opened in 1939 as a regular train station and became a subway stop in 2010.

Station Layout

Gallery

Around the station
Hallym University
Legoland Korea

References

Railway stations in Gangwon Province, South Korea
Metro stations in Chuncheon
Seoul Metropolitan Subway stations
Railway stations opened in 1939